Bartlett Township is an inactive township in Shannon County, in the U.S. state of Missouri.

Bartlett Township was erected in 1905, taking its name the community of Bartlett, Missouri.

References

Townships in Missouri
Townships in Shannon County, Missouri